Harold is an unincorporated community and census-designated place in Santa Rosa County, in the U.S. state of Florida. Its population was 823 as of the 2010 census.  A satellite field for Training Air Wing FIVE at Naval Air Station Whiting Field called OLF Harold is located here.

History
A post office called Harold was established in 1909, and remained in operation until 1995. An early postmaster gave the community the name of his son.

References

Unincorporated communities in Santa Rosa County, Florida
Census-designated places in Santa Rosa County, Florida
Unincorporated communities in Florida